Qodman (also, Godman, Kodman, and Kodoman) is a village and municipality in the Masally Rayon of Azerbaijan.  It has a population of 1,066.

References 

Populated places in Masally District